James Andrew Boyd (November 11, 1933 – January 2, 2013) was an American actor, born in Philadelphia.

Life and career
Boyd spent four years in the Air Force and studied at the American Academy for Dramatic Arts.

He did voice work (along with Wayland Flowers and Cleavon Little) for puppets on The Surprise Show, a children's program that aired locally in the New York City area in the late 1960s. The puppets used on the show, called Aniforms, had been developed by puppeteer Morey Bunin.

In 1971, the Children's Television Workshop (now Sesame Workshop) contacted Boyd because it wanted to use Aniforms in a television show that became known as The Electric Company. During the first season, Boyd's voice was used extensively, especially for the character J. Arthur Crank, who was just an angry voice on the telephone at the time. Boyd was unseen until season two, when he became a regular cast member, appearing on-camera until the show stopped production in 1977. Other characters he played included Andy, Wolfman, Blue Beetle, Paul the Gorilla, Fred Baxter, Steve Awesome, and Lorelei Loverly.

Boyd also appeared in the 1974 TV movie Out to Lunch, a Children's Television Workshop production in which the Muppets and casts of Sesame Street and The Electric Company take over the ABC News when the newsroom staff takes a lunch break. In 1993, Boyd played the role of Howard Turner in the TV series Law & Order. In 2006, he appeared in the TV documentary The Electric Company's Greatest Hits & Bits, talking about his experience on The Electric Company in an interview.

Boyd was the on-camera talent or voiceover talent for a number of industrial videos for a large body of corporate training and communication videos during the 1990s.

Death
Boyd died on January 2, 2013, following a short illness.

Filmography

Television

References

External links
 
 

1933 births
2013 deaths
American male voice actors
American sketch comedians
United States Air Force airmen
Male actors from Philadelphia